Barnston Island is an unincorporated island located in the Greater Vancouver metropolitan area of British Columbia, Canada. Most of the island is part of Metro Vancouver Electoral Area A; the remainder is Barnston Island Indian Reserve No. 3, which is outside Electoral Area A limits and is under the governance of the Katzie First Nation, headquartered across the river at their main reserve in Pitt Meadows. Although the island is unincorporated and not officially part of any municipality, mailing addresses on the island use Surrey as the city name.

Located in the Fraser River between Surrey and Pitt Meadows, Barnston Island was named in 1827 for Hudson's Bay Company Clerk George Barnston. The island has no direct road access to the rest of the area. It is accessed through the Barnston Island Ferry, a short 5-minute ferry route from Surrey on 104 Avenue across Parson's Channel; the ferry ride is free. Barnston Island's main road travels along the perimeter of the island.

Barnston Island contains mostly farmland and is home to a total population of 155 people (2001 census), 46 of whom live on the Barnston Island 3 Indian Reserve, located near the southeast part of the island. Statistics Canada defines the island as Vancouver CMA Census Tract 0251.00 of British Columbia.

History
The island was named for George Barnston, a Hudson's Bay Company clerk, who travelled with Chief Factor James McMillan to found Fort Langley in 1827.

Barnston Island first received electricity in 1938, following the laying of an underwater cable between Port Kells and the south side of the island.

In 2004, a group of landowners applied to the provincial Agricultural Land Commission to have approximately 85% of the land outside the Indigenous community removed from the Agricultural Land Reserve. On July 19, 2006 the Commission rejected the application.

Infrastructure
Barnston Island is home to several local companies, including: Barnston Island Herbs; Painted River Farm; Apollo Cranberries

There are no schools on Barnston Island. K-12 education of Barnston Island residents is provided by School District 36 Surrey. Students are zoned to Bothwell Elementary and Fraser Heights Secondary School.

Demographics (Barnston Island Indian Reserve No. 3)
In the 2011 Census, Statistics Canada originally reported that Barnston Island 3 had a population of 0 living in 1 of its 1 total dwellings, a -100.0% change from its 2006 population of 49. Statistics Canada subsequently amended the 2011 census results to a population of 47 living in 18 of its 18 total dwellings, a -4.3% change from 2006.

See also
Metro Vancouver Electoral Area A
James McMillan (fur trader)

References

External links
BritishColumbia.com
Save Barnston Island photo set
Community Profile: Barnston Island 3 Indian Reserve, British Columbia; Statistics Canada

 
Islands of the Fraser River
Unincorporated settlements in British Columbia
Populated places on the Fraser River
Islands of British Columbia